Amblymora v-flava is a species of beetle in the family Cerambycidae. It was described by Gilmour in 1950.

References

Amblymora
Beetles described in 1950